The women's T38 (including T35 athletes) 100 metres competition of the athletics events at the 2015 Parapan American Games was held on August 10 at the CIBC Athletics Stadium. The defending Parapan American Games champion was Jenifer Santos of Brazil.

Records
Prior to this competition, the existing records were as follows:

T35

T38

Schedule
All times are Central Standard Time (UTC-6).

Results
All times are shown in seconds.

Final
Athletes are classified as T38 unless indicated.
Wind: -0.5 m/s

References

Athletics at the 2015 Parapan American Games